"Papers" is a song by American urban recording artist Usher. The song was a buzz single for his sixth studio album Raymond v. Raymond. It was written by Usher, Alonzo "Gorilla Zoe" Mathis, Sean Garrett and Zaytoven, and was produced by the latter two. Although it was never identified as a track from the album, or as the lead single, it was released to U.S. urban and rhythmic radio stations on October 12, 2009, and subsequently available for digital download on October 16, 2009.

The song peaked at number thirty-one on the Billboard Hot 100 and topped the Hot R&B/Hip-Hop Songs, giving Usher his tenth number one song on the chart.

Background and composition
In June 2009, co-writer and producer of the song, Xavier "Zaytoven" Dotson revealed to MTV News that he worked with Usher on a song. Zaytoven divulged a few details, saying, "I can't wait for something like that to come out, so people can see I do more than just hip-hop. I can do R&B, pop, gospel ... whatever genre of music that's out. If you listen to [this new Usher song], you can't say, 'Zaytoven did that.'" According to Zaytoven in another interview with MTV News, the track was originally called "Filing Papers". Zaytoven said, "This is before there were any reports about Usher's marriage in the news. So I was thinking to myself, 'Is he trying to say something?' I don't know what Usher is going through, but Sean Garrett made a song about filling out papers, divorce papers. The beat, it's got a bounce to it. It's outta here." Sean Garrett later clarified, stating that the song was not necessarily called "Filing Papers", Garret commented, "Let's say I wrote a record for Usher three or four months ago where I really didn't have any idea of what he was going through personally. I work really hard at creating records I feel that's gonna fit like a glove to an artist. Me and Usher have a close relationship; I tend to sort of assist certain artists in giving them a direction, where I think they need to go in their next move. I felt that was the direction we needed to go. I felt that was the question everyone wanted to know: Was [his relationship] good or was it bad? Was it right? Are you happy or you're not?" Garrett continued to maintain that he had no idea of Usher's state of marriage during the time of the song's development, stating that the record could have meant anything, saying, "I'm a heavy believer in God. I'm a Pisces. My intuition is crazy. I think that's healthy in the process for me writing and producing for people. Maybe it was a sign of what my man was going through and he needed to get out. Maybe it was something she needed to hear as a wake-up call to her."

In October 2009, the track was released as the album's buzz single, not intended to be the first release of Raymond v. Raymond, but to generate reception and feedback. In March 2010, Usher continued to support Garrett's original claims, stating the song was recorded before his marriage ended. Usher said in an interview for MTV News for promoting Raymond v. Raymond: "I think people would have immediately alluded to the fact I was talking about my wife when I made that record — and now my ex-wife," he said. "When the song was recorded, I wasn't divorced. It was some reality in the contrast of trying to make it all work, having to balance a career and having a normal life. Coming in at 6 in the morning and arguing was a reality when you have those type of relationships. I felt that in a way, the story did touch on certain things at the time. I didn't know how realistic it would become. I didn't know I would become divorced. I did know it spoke on the contrast between trying to balance this world of being married and having this responsibility that's like a marriage at the same time. The song spoke to that place. Unfortunately, it did become a reality."

Garrett said the song appeals to everyone, saying "Whether you're a female in love, male in love, it's a real record. Your mama has to feel this record, your daddy has to feel this record, everybody has to feel this record. That's what good writers do." Of its appeal Garrett said that it would have the effect of "Yeah!", and called the song an "explosive record". Garrett went on to say, "I definitely feel it's what Usher's been wanting to say. But at the same time, it's what a lot of people wanted to say, they just didn't know what to say." Jayson Rodriguez of MTV News said that "Usher pulls back the curtain, revealing that a rumored rift between him and his mother was very real", and the song could be heard as a "postmortem" on his marriage, through the lines, "For you I gave my heart and turned my back against the world/ 'Cause you were my girl, girl, girl, I done damn near lost my mama, I done been through so much drama/ I done turned into the man I never thought I'd be/ I'm ready to sign them papers."

Critical reception

Sarah MacRory of Billboard, compared the song to 2004's "Burn" comparing "Papers" to the former number one hit's "layered harmonies, mellow production and lyrics of heartache". MacRory also said, "It's the first time in a while that the singer sounds energized, as he unleashes deeply personal lyrics about the real-life sacrifices he made for love." Jayson Rodriguez of MTV News predicted that if "Papers" were any indication of his upcoming album, then "Raymond vs. Raymond may break some sales records", as Confessions was the last time when "art was inspired by his life". Andy Kellman of Allmusic said that Usher "pours himself" into the "Papers" and that the song "bears the closest relation to the turbulence he experienced." Greg Kot of the Chicago Tribune said that "It’s the kind of lacerating perspective that adulthood brings, but Usher’s too busy chasing his past to fully embrace it." Leah Greenblatt of Entertainment Weekly said that the song was the album's "last-straw slow jam" and the only song other than "Foolin' Around" that offers real revelation.

Chart performance
On the week ending October 31, 2009 "Papers" debuted on the Billboard Hot 100 at ninety-two. In its second week, it moved sixty-one spots to thirty-one, where it peaked. The song spent a total of sixteen weeks on the chart. "Papers" also reached number one on the Billboard Hot R&B/Hip-Hop Songs becoming Usher's tenth number-one song on that chart.

Track listing
Digital download
 "Papers" – 4:21

Credits and personnel
Songwriting - Usher Raymond, Sean Garrett, Zaytoven, Alonzo Mathis
Production - Sean Garrett, Zaytoven
Background vocals - Shelea Frazier, Romika Faniel, Tommy Parker, Solomon Dykes, Timothy Bloom
Vocal production - Rico Love
Recording - Miles Walker
Vocal recording - Ian Cross, assisted by Blake Harden and Brandon Parks
Mixing - Ian Cross and Matt Marrin, assisted by Alex Barajas
Source:

Charts

Weekly charts

Year-end charts

Release history

See also
List of R&B number-one singles of 2009 (U.S.)

References

2009 singles
Usher (musician) songs
Songs written by Sean Garrett
Pop ballads
Contemporary R&B ballads
2009 songs
Songs written by Usher (musician)
LaFace Records singles
Songs written by Gorilla Zoe
Songs written by Zaytoven
Song recordings produced by Zaytoven
2000s ballads